Shaun William Keaveny (born 14 June 1972) is a British broadcaster who presented the Breakfast Show on radio station BBC Radio 6 Music for 11 years, and the afternoon show for a further 3 years.

Education and early life
Keaveny grew up on the Higher Folds housing estate in Leigh, Lancashire. He attended St Mary's Catholic High School, Astley and then Trinity and All Saints College in Leeds.

Career
Keaveny joined the BBC and presented the weekday afternoon show (Monday-Thursday) and the Friday breakfast show on XFM London until 2006.

Keaveny joined BBC Radio 6 Music in 2007 and presented its late evening show until April 2007. He began presenting the BBC 6 Music Breakfast Show on 2 April 2007. He also substitutes for a range of presenters on BBC Radio 2. The show was originally presented by Phill Jupitus, who had hosted the show since the station's inception in March 2002. The show had regular music news updates from presenter Matt Everitt and Georgie Rogers. Professor Brian Cox was a regular contributor to the show.

Keaveny's first book, R2D2 lives in Preston was published in November 2010. It is a compilation of little known facts relating to various towns throughout the United Kingdom, advised by listeners to his radio show in a feature entitled Toast the Nation.

On 16 February 2013, Keaveny took part in the fifth series of Let's Dance for Comic Relief as a member of Destiny's Dad alongside fellow stand-up comedians Hal Cruttenden and Mark Dolan.

It was announced in August 2018 that Keaveny would move from his weekday BBC 6 Music breakfast show, to the Radcliffe and Maconie weekday afternoon slot in January 2019. Keaveny hosted his final Breakfast Show live from the Maida Vale Studios on 14 December 2018 as part of the BBC 6 Music All Day Christmas Party.

The Channel 5 series The Mega Council Estate Nextdoor aired in September 2020 was narrated by Keaveny.

In June 2021, he announced that he would be leaving 6 Music in September 2021 after 14 years at the station saying "Things change, places change, people change, and it's time for a change."

In August 2021 and March 2022, he presented the Saturday teatime show on BBC Radio 2 covering for Liza Tarbuck.

His final 6 Music show was on 10 September 2021.

After leaving BBC 6 Music he set up Community Garden Radio, an internet service which sees Keaveny broadcast a live show every Friday, and started a podcast called Creative Cul De Sac about people's unrealised ideas, as well as hosting The Line-Up, discussing guests' dream festivals.

In late 2022 he joined Greatest Hits Radio as a cover presenter and sat in for Mark Goodier on the mid-morning show from 7–11 November.

Personal life 
Keaveny is married, and a parent to two sons and a daughter.

References

External links

Your Place or Mine with Shaun Keaveny (BBC Radio 4)

British radio DJs
British radio personalities
British television personalities
British people of Irish descent
Living people
1972 births
People from Leigh, Greater Manchester
Alumni of Leeds Trinity University
BBC Radio 6 Music presenters
BBC Radio 2 presenters